Dr. Béla Perczel de Bonyhád (15 June 1819 – 25 March 1888) was a Hungarian politician and jurist, who served as Minister of Justice between 1875 and 1878. His son was the Interior Minister and Speaker of the House of Representatives Dezső Perczel. He was the leader of the Deák Party between 1869 and 1872. He was elected as Speaker of the House of Representatives in 1874.

Béla Wenckheim appointed him Minister of Justice in 1875. Perczel held his position in the Kálmán Tisza cabinet. The first modern Hungarian penal code (Csemegi Codex) is connected to his name. He resigned in 1878. Later he became chairman of the Court. He was a member of the House of Magnates from 1886 until his death.

References
 Magyar Életrajzi Lexikon

1819 births
1888 deaths
19th-century Hungarian politicians
Justice ministers of Hungary
Speakers of the House of Representatives of Hungary